The Princeton Tigers women's hockey team represents Princeton University in the 2010–11 NCAA Division I women's ice hockey season.

Recruiting

News and notes

Nov 6-7: Freshman Sally Butler had two goals (both game winners) and an assists as the Tigers won both weekend games. The first game was a 2-1 win over Rensselaer. The following day, Princeton faced a 2-0 deficit against the Union Dutchwomen. The Tigers would force overtime, where Butler scored the overtime winner. In all three of Princeton’s victories, Butler has scored the game-winning goals.

Exhibition

Regular season
December 10–11: In both games versus Syracuse, Butler accumulated three goals. In the first game, a 4–2 triumph, Butler scored the first and fourth goals for the Tigers. The following day, Butler scored the Tigers' third goal of the game in a 5–0 shutout of the Syracuse Orange. In two games versus Syracuse, Weber won both games and had a goals against average of 1.00. On December 10, she stopped 23 of 25 shots. Both goals were allowed in the power play on the third period. The following day, she earned her second shutout of the season as she made 14 saves.
December 31: Rachel Weber made 24 saves as the Tigers upset the fifth-ranked Boston College Eagles by a 3–0 margin. It was Weber’s third shutout in four games and her goals against average for the season was then lowered to 1.93
January 3, 7–8: In three games played, Rachel Weber earned three victories and allowed only one goal. On January 3, she defeated Quinnipiac by a 3–0 tally and shut out Clarkson by a 2–0 score on January 7. The following day, she gave up her only goal of the week in a 3–1 win over St. Lawrence. Her shutout streak spanned six games and lasted 289:43. She is now the owner of the longest shutout streak in ECAC history and the fourth longest in NCAA Division I since the 2000–01 season.
January 8: St. Lawrence outshot Princeton 30-21 at Appleton Arena but were bested by a 3–1 tally. Tigers goalie Rachel Weber made 29 saves to preserve the win.

Standings

Schedule

Conference record

Awards and honors
Amy Bourbeau, 2011 AHCA Assistant Coach Award (inaugural winner)
Sally Butler, ECAC Rookie of the Week (Week of November 9) 
Sally Butler, Princeton, MLX Skates ECAC Rookie of the Week (Week of December 14, 2010) 
 Sasha Sherry, 2010-11 Second Team All-Ivy
 Rachel Weber, MLX Skates ECAC Defensive Player of the Week (Week of December 14, 2010) 
Rachel Weber, Princeton, MLX Skates Defensive Player of the Week (Week of January 4, 2011) 
Rachel Weber, Princeton, MLX Skates Defensive Player of the Week (Week of January 11, 2011) 
Rachel Weber, Finalist, ECAC Goaltender of the Year Award
 Rachel Weber, 2010-11 Second Team All-Ivy

See also
2009–10 Princeton Tigers women's ice hockey season

References

P
P
Princeton Tigers women's ice hockey seasons
Princeton Tigers
Princeton Tigers